XHZHO-FM is a radio station on 98.5 FM in Zihuatanejo, Guerrero, Mexico.

History
XEZHO-AM 1410 received its concession on October 26, 1994. It was owned by Radio Fama, S.A. de C.V., broadcasting with 5,000 watts as a daytimer. Pegaso acquired XEZHO in 2002, not long after shuttering its Red W Interactiva radio venture, and converted it to operate with 2 kW day and 1 kW night.

In November 2010, XEZHO was cleared to move to FM as XHZHO-FM 98.5. For a time, it operated as local talk station , owned by Grupo Pegaso before flipping to grupera, namely the La Mejor and Ke Buena formats. During this time, XHZHO was a sister station to XHUQ-FM under Alfa Medios.

In October 2016, Ke Buena moved from XHZHO to XHUQ as the former was spun off. This lasted until returning to La Mejor on February 15, 2021. The format was then dropped the next year, with XHZHO switching to the sister FM Globo brand in September 2022.

References

Radio stations in Guerrero
Radio stations established in 1994
1994 establishments in Mexico